Peter Pan is a 2003 fantasy adventure film directed by P. J. Hogan and written by Hogan and Michael Goldenberg. The screenplay is based on the 1904 play and 1911 novel Peter Pan, or The Boy Who Wouldn't Grow Up by J.M. Barrie and the Disney animated feature of the same name in 1953. Jason Isaacs plays the dual roles of Captain Hook and George Darling, Olivia Williams plays Mary Darling, while Jeremy Sumpter plays Peter Pan, Rachel Hurd-Wood plays Wendy Darling, and Ludivine Sagnier plays Tinker Bell. Lynn Redgrave plays a supporting role as Aunt Millicent, a new character created for the film.

After completing the script, Hogan and Goldenberg were given approval by Great Ormond Street Hospital, which held the rights to Barrie's story. Principal photography took place in Australia at Village Roadshow Studios on the Gold Coast, Queensland from September 2002 to May 2003.

Peter Pan premiered at the Empire in Leicester Square, London on 9 December 2003 and was theatrically released by Universal Pictures, Columbia Pictures, and Revolution Studios in the United Kingdom on 24 December 2003 and in the United States on 25 December 2003. The film received positive reviews from critics, with praise for the performances (particularly that of Sumpter, Hurd-Wood and Isaacs), visuals, romantic feel, and Howard's musical score, but only grossed $122 million worldwide. With an estimated budget of $130.6 million (not including marketing costs), the film was a box office failure resulting in a $70–95 million loss.

Plot

In 1904 London, Wendy Darling tells her younger brothers John and Michael stories of Captain Hook and his pirates. Peter Pan overhears her from outside their nursery window. Dissatisfied with Wendy's stories, Aunt Millicent advises the Darlings to focus on her future prospects. One night, Wendy sees Peter return to the nursery to watch her sleep, but his shadow is bitten off by the family's nurse dog, Nana. At school, Wendy's teacher discovers her drawing a picture of Peter. Wendy tries stopping a disciplinary letter from reaching her father, only to publicly embarrass him when Nana chases her into the bank.

Searching for his shadow, Peter befriends Wendy, who sews it back onto him. He invites Wendy and her brothers to Neverland so she can tell her stories to his gang of Lost Boys. Using Tinker Bell's fairy dust, the four fly to Neverland, while Nana alerts Mr. and Mrs. Darling of what has happened. In Neverland, Captain Hook and his pirate crew soon attack the children. Jealous of Peter's affection for Wendy, Tinker Bell tricks the Lost Boys into shooting the girl out of the sky, who mistake her for a bird. Fortunately, Wendy survives, saved by an acorn Peter had given her earlier. Peter banishes Tinker Bell and ends their friendship.

Wendy agrees to the Lost Boys' request to be their "mother", while Peter takes the role of their father. Meanwhile, John and Michael encounter Tiger Lily, a Native American princess, and Hook and his crew take the three to the Black Castle. Peter, Wendy, and the Lost Boys rescue them, as Hook is chased by the crocodile who has followed him for years. After a celebration at the Native American camp, Peter shows Wendy the fairies' home and the two share a romantic dance. Hook spies on the pair and convinces Tinker Bell that Peter will eventually choose to leave Neverland for Wendy. When Wendy asks Peter to express his feelings, he angrily demands she return home, refusing to believe that he can ever feel love without having to grow up. Peter then flies off, returns to the Darling nursery and unsuccessfully tries shutting the open window, determined to keep Wendy in Neverland.

Wendy urges her brothers to return home with her, as they are starting to forget their parents. The Lost Boys eventually decide to join them, to Peter's dismay. Wendy says goodbye to Peter, leaving him a cup of medicine to drink. When Wendy leaves the hideout, she and the rest of the boys are captured by Hook's crew, who also poison Peter's medicine. However, Tinker Bell drinks it to save his life. Devastated and begging for forgiveness, Peter repeatedly proclaims his belief in fairies and telepathically reaches out to everyone at Neverland and London to do the same. This revives Tinker Bell, who helps Peter rescue Wendy and free the Lost Boys. During the ensuing fight with the pirates, Hook forcefully uses Tinker Bell's dust to grant him flying abilities. During their duel, Hook taunts Peter about Wendy wanting to abandon him, and how she will eventually grow up and marry another man. Weakened, Peter falls and is incapacitated. Hook allows Wendy to say goodbye to Peter before killing him. Finally professing her love for Peter, Wendy kisses him, which brings back his happiness.

Full of life again, Peter defeats Hook, who is swallowed up by the crocodile. Covering the Jolly Roger in fairy dust, Peter flies Wendy and the boys back to London where they are reunited with Mr. and Mrs. Darling, who adopts the rest of the Lost Boys. Slightly, who got lost on the way to London and arrives at the house late, is adopted by Millicent while Mr. Darling reconciles with his children. Peter promises Wendy he will never forget her and one day he will return to visit her, before returning to Neverland with Tinker Bell. Despite never seeing Peter again, she continues to tell his story to her own children, and in turn to their grandchildren and so on.

Cast
 Jeremy Sumpter as Peter Pan: A young boy who can fly and refuses to grow up.
 Jason Isaacs as Captain Hook: The captain of the Jolly Roger, and Mr. Darling, the Darling children's father.
 Rachel Hurd-Wood as Wendy Darling: the eldest child of the Darling family and Peter’s love interest. 
 Saffron Burrows plays the adult Wendy, who narrates the film and appears in the unused epilogue.
 Ludivine Sagnier as Tinker Bell: Peter's emotional fairy companion.
 Olivia Williams as Mrs. Darling: the Darling children's mother.
 Lynn Redgrave as Aunt Millicent: the aunt of the three Darling children, a character created for the film.
 Richard Briers as Mr. Smee: Hook's dimwitted first-mate.
 Harry Newell as John Darling: the middle child of the Darling family. 
 Freddie Popplewell as Michael Darling: the youngest child of the Darling family.
 Rebel as Nana: the dog nurse of the Darling family.
 Carsen Gray as Tiger Lily: the daughter of a Native American chief.
 Kerry Walker as Miss Fulsom: a strict schoolteacher.
 Mathew Waters as the messenger boy

The Lost Boys
 Theodore Chester as Slightly
 Rupert Simonian as Tootles
 George MacKay as Curly
 Harry Eden as Nibs
 Patrick Gooch and Lachlan Gooch as the Twins

The Pirate Crew
 Alan Cinis as Skylights
 Frank Whitten as Starkey
 Bruce Spence as Cookson
 Daniel Wyllie as Alf Mason
 Brian Carbee as Albino
 Don Battee as Giant Pirate
 Frank Gallacher as Alsatian Fogarty
 Septimus Caton as Noodler
 Jacob Tomuri as Bill Jukes
 Venant Wong as Quang Lee
 Phil Meacham as Bollard
 Darren Mitchell as Mullins
 Michael Roughan as Cecco

Production

Development
The film is dedicated to Dodi Al-Fayed, who was executive producer of the 1991 film Hook. Al-Fayed planned to produce a live action version of Peter Pan, and shared his ideas with Diana, Princess of Wales (who was President of Great Ormond St Hospital), who said she "could not wait to see the production once it was underway." Al-Fayed's father, Mohammed Al-Fayed, co-produced the 2003 adaptation of the tale after his son died in the car crash which also killed Diana, Princess of Wales. Finding Neverland, a film about J. M. Barrie and the creation of Peter Pan, was originally scheduled to be released in 2003, but the producers of this film – who held the screen rights to the story – refused permission for that film to use scenes from the play unless its release was delayed until the following year.

Casting
Contrary to the traditional stage casting, the film featured a young boy in the title role. In July 2002, at age 13, Jeremy Sumpter was selected for the role of Peter Pan. Since the first stage production of the story, the title role has usually been played by a woman, a tradition followed in the first film adaptation. Two subsequent animated adaptations have featured a male voice actor as Peter Pan, and a Soviet live-action film adaptation for television cast a boy to play the role. This film was the first live-action theatrical release with a boy playing the part. The casting of a single actor to play both George Darling and Captain Hook follows a tradition also begun in the first staging of the play. Jason Isaacs was selected for the part.

Brie Larson auditioned for Wendy Darling.

Filming
Sumpter did nearly all of his stunts for the film himself. To prepare, he says he practiced sword fighting as much as five hours a day, as well as training in gymnastics and lifting weights. Isaacs also trained for sword fighting as well. Principal photography began on 17 September 2002 and concluded on 5 May 2003, taking place entirely inside sound stages on Australia's Gold Coast, Queensland. According to Fisher, the decision to shoot in Australia was based on the low value of the Australian dollar at that time.
Hogan had originally planned on filming in a variety of locations such as Tahiti, New Zealand, and London but abandoned this idea after scouting some of the locations.
Filming on sound stages did help "retain some of the theatricality of the original play", something which Hogan thought was important.

Visual effects
The visual effects in the film are a mixture of practical and digital. The fairies that appear in the film are actors composited into the film with some digital enhancements. According to actor Jason Isaacs, the filmmakers were impressed with actress Ludivine Sagnier's performance and decided to abandon their plans to make Tinker Bell entirely computer animated. The film also features a large, computer-generated crocodile. Another character, an animatronic parrot, appears in some scenes on the pirate ship. A similar parrot will appear in the 2023 film Peter Pan And Wendy, but in more scenes than this one. A complex harness was built to send the live-action actors rotating and gliding through the air for the flight sequences. They were then composited into the shots of London and Neverland, although they are sometimes replaced with computer-generated figures. One other aspect of bringing the story to life was the complex sword-fighting sequences, for which the actors were trained. Sumpter said that, "I had to train for five months before the shoot. I had to do harness training to learn how to fly and learn how to swordfight," and that, "I got stabbed a couple of times with a sword." Hogan says that the flying scenes were very difficult to accomplish, but that, "it was tougher on the kids than it was for me. They were up there on the harness 12' off the ground, having to make it look like flying is easy and fun." Sumpter grew several inches over the course of the film's production, requiring staging tricks to retain Hook's height advantage over Peter in face-to-face scenes late in the process. Hollywood-based producer Lucy Fisher also said that, "The window he flies out of had to be enlarged twice."

Release
This film was released in theatres on 18 December 2003 in Australia, on 24 December 2003 in the United Kingdom and on 25 December 2003 in the United States. The film was distributed by Universal Pictures in the United States, Canada, Australia, New Zealand, the United Kingdom, and South Africa, and by Columbia Pictures in the rest of the world.

Marketing
For the promotion of the film, the original novel of Peter Pan by J.M. Barrie was re-released displaying the film's promotional material. A video game based on the film titled Peter Pan: The Motion Picture Event was released for Game Boy Advance on 4 November 2003, developed by Saffire and published by Atari Interactive, receiving mixed reviews from critics.

Reception

Critical response
Review aggregator Rotten Tomatoes gives the film a score of 77% based on 145 reviews and an average rating of 6.8/10. The website's critical consensus reads, "Solid if far from definitive, this version of Peter Pan is visually impressive, psychologically complex and faithful to its original source." On Metacritic, the film has a weighted average score of 64 out of 100, based on 33 critics, indicating "generally favorable reviews". Audiences polled by CinemaScore gave the film an average grade of "A-" on an A+ to F scale.

Film critic Roger Ebert gave the film three and a half out of four stars. MovieGuide has also favourably reviewed the film, calling it "a wonderfully crafted, morally uplifting movie that intentionally emphasizes the fantasy elements of the story both in dialogue and design of the film."

Box office
Peter Pan earned $48,462,608 at the box office in the United States and another $73.5 million outside the US, which brings the worldwide total to nearly $122 million. The film’s failure was partly due to its competition with the highly anticipated epic fantasy The Lord of the Rings: The Return of the King released the week before, and the family comedy Cheaper by the Dozen, which opened on the same day.

Accolades

Academy of Science Fiction, Fantasy and Horror Films

|-
|rowspan="4"| 2003
| Jeremy Sumpter
| Best Performance by a Younger Actor
| 
|-
| 
| Best Fantasy Film
| 
|-
| Rachel Hurd-Wood
| Best Performance by a Younger Actor
| 
|- 
| Janet Patterson
| Best Costumes
| 
|-
|}

Broadcast Film Critics Association Awards

|-
| 2003
| Peter Pan
| Best Family Film – Live Action
| 
|}

Las Vegas Film Critics Society Awards

|-
|2003
| Rachel Hurd-Wood
| Best Youth in Film
| 
|-
|}

Phoenix Film Critics Society Awards

|-
|rowspan="2"| 2003
| Peter Pan
| Best Live Action Family Film
| 
|-
| Jeremy Sumpter
| Best Performance by a Youth in a Lead or Supporting Role – Male
| 
|-
|}

Visual Effects Society Awards

|-
|rowspan="2"| 2003
|Yusei Uesugi 
Giles Hancock
| Outstanding Matte Painting in a Motion Picture
| 
|-
| Ludivine Sagnier
| Outstanding Performance by a Male or Female Actor in an Effects Film
| 
|-
|}

Young Artist Awards

|-
|rowspan="5"| 2004
| Jeremy Sumpter
| Best Performance in a Feature Film – Leading Young Actor
| 
|-
| Peter Pan
| Best Family Feature Film – Drama
| 
|-
| Rachel Hurd-Wood
| Best Performance in a Feature Film – Leading Young Actress
| 
|-
| Harry Newell
| Best Performance in a Feature Film – Supporting Young Actor
| 
|-
| Carsen Gray
| Best Performance in a Feature Film – Supporting Young Actress
| 
|-
|}

References

External links

 

2003 films
2000s American films
2000s British films
2000s English-language films
2000s children's adventure films
2000s fantasy adventure films
2000s children's fantasy films
British children's fantasy films
British films based on plays
American films based on plays
Films set in 1904
Peter Pan films
American children's adventure films
American children's fantasy films
American fantasy adventure films
Films about fairies and sprites
Films about child abduction
Films set in London
Films based on children's books
Films about Native Americans
Films about mermaids
American nonlinear narrative films
American swashbuckler films
Films shot at Village Roadshow Studios
Films scored by James Newton Howard
Films with screenplays by Michael Goldenberg
Films produced by Lucy Fisher
Films produced by Douglas Wick
Films directed by P. J. Hogan
Universal Pictures films
Columbia Pictures films
Revolution Studios films